Labeobarbus dimidiatus is a species of ray-finned fish in the  family Cyprinidae. It is endemic to the Ruo River in Malawi.

References

clarkeae
Fish described in 1998